Ustwo Fampany Limited (typically stylized as ustwo) is a London-based software development studio focused on digital design, such as clean and elegant user interfaces. Founded in 2004, the company had initially served clients in supporting their mobile apps, and developed mobile games, but gained significant attention upon release of Monument Valley in 2014, which won numerous awards and had over two million units sold. Alongside their Ustwo Games division, the company continues to produce other software for a range of computing devices through Ustwo Studios, as well as investing in new firms through Ustwo Adventure, and helping to mentor young talent within Ustwo Foundation.

History 
Ustwo was founded by Matt "Mills" Miller and John "Sinx" Sinclair in the Shoreditch district of London in November 2004 as "Ustwo Studio, Ltd", aiming to get into the nascent mobile app market. Miller and Sinclair had been friends since they were eleven, and so the name "Ustwo" is in reference to their long-term relation, "us two".

Prior to the founding, Miller and Sinclair had been working at a design firm called Big Animal who had Sony as a client. After Ustwo was founded, they were able to gain work from Sony Ericsson from this prior relationship to help design a user interface. Additional work came from similar word-of-mouth for banking firm JPMorgan.

In 2007, Apple, Inc. introduced the iPhone and with it, the App Store in 2008. Miller and Sinclair saw the opportunity here to make and sell their own applications directly to consumers via the App Store, and started to explore that area. They toyed with various apps, having limited success outside of one title, MouthOff, that had a cartoon mouth on screen mimick mouth movements on hearing speech that they released in 2009. The app earned Ustwo , a product of strong word-of-mouth from works like Creative Review,
 Techcrunch, BBC, and CNN, according to Miller. MouthOff led to them gaining work from retail chain H&M. Work over the next few years split between client work and developing their own apps, splitting off the games development section into "Ustwo Games" while the client services remained at "Ustwo Studios". During this time, they developed Whale Trail in 2011, a children's game, which led to a deal with Penguin Group for an ebook and television series, and Blip Blop in 2012.
 The company did not focus on producing volumes of game apps to generate revenue, but instead felt that what few games they put should reflect the high quality their studio had become known for.

Ustwo's breakout title came in 2014 with Monument Valley. Monument Valley was developed as an artistic game, inspired by M. C. Escher works, and meant to have simple controls. Monument Valley was critically praised, being named the Apple Store's Editors Choice and later winning the Apple Design Award in 2014. Ustwo had developed a relation with Apple, such that the surprise release of Monument Valley 2 was a headline presentation at the 2017 Apple Worldwide Developers Conference, and had their next major title Assemble with Care as one of the premiere titles available on launch of Apple Arcade in September 2019. Assemble with Care was later ported to Microsoft Windows and released on March 26, 2020.

With this, Ustwo began expanding its business by forming joint ventures with other startup firms, as well as establishing an investment arm proving both financial and service-related support for new firms.

In 2014, Ustwo co-founded DICE, a ticketing platform, with Phil Hutcheon, founder of music managing company Deadly Management.

Ustwo renamed themselves as "Ustwo Fampany Ltd." in 2015, with "fampany" representing their desire to have their studio to be a combination of "family" and "company".

In 2019, Ustwo fired an employee for labour organizing at the company. The Independent Workers' Union of Great Britain, which represents him through Game Workers Unite UK, filed suit on the worker's behalf. Lana Polansky of Waypoint criticized Ustwo for adopting progressive language and values to camouflage workplace issues and union busting activities.

Structure 
Ustwo Fampany has four primary divisions: 
 Ustwo Studios is the segment that offers client services for developing mobile applications and other computer software.
 Ustwo Games is the division focused on game development
 Ustwo Adventure is the venture capital portion of the business, investing into smaller firms
 Ustwo Foundation seeks to encourage creative growth in promising young persons

As of 2022, Ustwo had studios in Malmö, Lisbon, Tokyo, and New York in addition to the London headquarters, employing about 260 employees worldwide.

Games developed

References

External links 
 

2004 establishments in England
Apple Design Awards recipients
British companies established in 2004
Privately held companies based in London
Software companies based in London
Video game companies established in 2004
Video game companies of the United Kingdom
Video game development companies